This is a list of Delta Omicron national honorary members.

References

Delta Omicron
American music awards